María Camila Viafara Lobón (born September 30, 1995) is a Colombian weightlifter and Pan American Games Champion competing in the 58 kg category until 2018 and 59 kg starting in 2018 after the International Weightlifting Federation reorganized the categories.

Career
In 2019 she competed at the 2019 Pan American Games in the 59 kg division winning a gold medal.

References

External links

Living people
Colombian female weightlifters
1995 births
Pan American Games medalists in weightlifting
Pan American Games gold medalists for Colombia
Weightlifters at the 2019 Pan American Games
Medalists at the 2019 Pan American Games
21st-century Colombian women